This is a bibliography of works by and about Philip Roth.

Fiction

Novels and novellas

 I The Nathan Zuckerman appearing in this book is not the same as the one appearing in later books, but a creation of the fictional writer Peter Tarnopol.

Short stories and reviews

Non-fiction

Memoirs

On writing and writers

Books

Essays

Collections

Library of America editions

The first nine volumes are edited by Ross Miller, the last by the author himself.

Adaptations

Roth's adaptations of works by others 
 Theatre Adaptation of It Isn't Fair by Jean Rhys (in collaboration with David Plante), 1977
 Theatre Adaptation of Journey into the Whirlwind by Yevgenia Ginzburg, 1977
 Theatre Adaptation of The Cherry Orchard by Anton Chekhov (in collaboration with David Magarshack), 1977
 Theatre Adaptation of The Name-Day Party by Anton Chekhov, 1977

Roth's adaptations of his own work 
 TV Adaptation of The Ghost Writer (in collaboration with Tristram Powell), 1984
 TV Adaptation of The Prague Orgy (unproduced), 1985

Adaptations of Roth's work by others 
 Goodbye, Columbus - 1969 film
 Portnoy's Complaint - 1972 film
 The Human Stain - 2003 film
 Elegy - 2008 film; adaptation of The Dying Animal
 The Humbling - 2014 film
 American Pastoral - 2016 film
 Indignation - 2016 film
 The Plot Against America - 2020 miniseries

Interviews
{| class="wikitable sortable"
|+
|-
! interviewer !! Title !! Originally published in !! Notes
|-
| Martha McGregor || The NBA Winner Talks Back || 1960 || in George J. Searles (ed.), Conversations with Philip Roth(Jackson, U.P. of Mississippi, 1992)
|-
| Jerre Mangione || Philip Roth || 1966 || in G. J. Searles (ed.), cit.
|-
| || Philip Roth Tells about When She Was Good || Literary Guild Magazine, July 1967 || 
|-
| Howard Junker || Will This Finally Be Philip Roth's Year? || 1969 || in G. J. Searles (ed.), cit.
|-
| Albert Goldman || Portnoy's Complaint by Philip Roth Looms as a Wild Blue Shocker and the American Novel of the Sixties || 1969 || in G. J. Searles (ed.), cit.
|-
| George Plimpton || Philip Roth's Exact Intent || 1969 || in G. J. Searles (ed.), cit.
|-
| Alan Lelchuk || On Satirizing Presidents || 1971 || in G. J. Searles (ed.), cit.
|-
| Walter Clemons || Joking in the Square || 1971 || in G. J. Searles (ed.), cit.
|-
| Alan Lelchuk || On The Breast || 1972 || in G. J. Searles (ed.), cit.
|-
| Joyce Carol Oates || A Conversation with Philip Roth || Ontario Review, Fall 1974 || 
|-
| Martha Saxton || Philip Roth Talks about His Own Work || 1974 || in G. J. Searles (ed.), cit.
|-
| Walter Mauro || Writing and the Powers-that-Be || 1974 || in G. J. Searles (ed.), cit.
|-
| Sara Davidson || Talk with Philip Roth || 1977 || in G. J. Searles (ed.), cit.
|-
| James Atlas || A Visit with Philip Roth || 1979 || in G. J. Searles (ed.), cit.
|-
|Michiko Kakutani||Is Roth Really Writing about Roth? || New York Times, May 1981 ||
|-
| Richard Stern || Roth Unbound || Saturday Review, June 1981 ||
|-
| Alan Finkielkraut || The Ghosts of Roth || 1981 || in G. J. Searles (ed.), cit.
|-
| Ronald Hayman || Philip Roth: Should Sane Women Shy Away from Him at Parties? || 1981 || in G. J. Searles (ed.), cit.
|-
| || The Book That I'm Writing || New York Times, 12 June 1983, late ed. ||
|-
| Cathleen Medwick || A Meeting of Arts and Minds || 1983 || in G. J. Searles (ed.), cit.
|-
| Jonathan Brent || "The job", says Roth, "was to give pain its due" || 1983 || in G. J. Searles (ed.), cit.
|-
| Jesse Kornbluth || Zuckerman Found? Philip Roth's One-Man Art Colony || 1983 || in G. J. Searles (ed.), cit.
|-
| David Plante || Conversations with Philip: Diary of a Friendship || 1984 || in G. J. Searles (ed.), cit.
|- 
| Hermione Lee || The Art of Fiction, LXXXIV || 1984 || in G. J. Searles (ed.), cit.
|-
| Clive Sinclair || Doctor or Pornographer?Clive Sinclair Talks to Philip Roth about His New Book, || 1984 || in G. J. Searles (ed.), cit.
|-
| Mervyn Rothstein || The Unbounded Spirit of Philip Roth || New York Times, 1 August 1985 || 
|-
| Ian Hamilton || A Confusion of Realms || 1985 || in G. J. Searles (ed.), cit.
|-
| Mervyn Rothstein || Philip Roth and the World of «What If?» || 1986 || in G. J. Searles (ed.), cit.
|- 
| Paula Span || Roth's Zuckerman Redux; for «The Counterlife», Leading His Altered Ego through Life, Death and Renewal || Washington Post, 6 January 1987 || 
|-
| Paul Gray || The Varnished Truths of Philip Roth || 1987 || in G. J. Searles (ed.), cit.
|-
| Alvin P. Sanoff || Writers Have a Third Eye || 1987 || in G. J. Searles (ed.), cit.
|-
| Katharine Weber || Life, Counterlife || 1987 || in G. J. Searles (ed.), cit.
|- 
| Ken Adachi || Is Anyone out There Actually Reading? || Toronto Star, 17 September 1988 ||
|-
| Asher Z. Milbauerand Donald G. Watson || An Interview with Philip Roth || 1988 || in G. J. Searles (ed.), cit.
|- 
| Jonathan Brent || What Facts? A Talk with Philip Roth || 1988 || in G. J. Searles (ed.), cit.
|- 
| Katharine Weber || PW Interviews: Philip Roth || 1988 || in G. J. Searles (ed.), cit.
|- 
| Linda Matchan || Philip Roth Faces "The Facts" || 1988 || in G. J. Searles (ed.), cit.
|- 
| Mervyn Rothstein || From Philip Roth, "The Facts" as He Remembers Them || 1988 || in G. J. Searles (ed.), cit.
|- 
| || Goodbye Newark: Roth Remembers His Beginnings || New York Times, 1 October 1989 ||
|-
| Brian D. Johnson || Intimate Affairs || 1990 || in G. J. Searles (ed.), cit.
|- 
| Hermione Lee || "Life Is and": Philip Roth in 1990 || 1990 || in G. J. Searles (ed.), cit.
|- 
| Alvin P. Sanoff || Facing a Father's Death || 1990 || in G. J. Searles (ed.), cit.
|-
| Lynn Darling || His Father's Son || Newsday, 28 January 1991 ||
|-
| Lynn Darling || A Moving Family Memoir on Life and Death in «Patrimony» || 1991 || in G. J. Searles (ed.), cit.
|- 
| Mervyn Rothstein || To Newark, with Love. Philip Roth || 1991 || in G. J. Searles (ed.), cit.
|- 
| Molly McQuade || Just a Lively Boy || 1991 || in G. J. Searles (ed.), cit.
|- 
| Marjorie Keyishian || Roth Returning to Newark to Get History Award || New York Times, 4 October 1992 ||
|-
| Esther B. Fein || Philip Roth Sees Double. And Maybe Triple, Too || New York Times, 9 March 1993 ||
|- 
| Esther B. Fein || "Believe Me," Says Roth with a Straight Face || New York Times, 9 March 1993 late ed. ||
|- 
| Dan Cryer || Talking with Philip Roth: Author Meets the Critics || Newsday, 28 March 1993 ||
|-
| Mifflin Houghton || I Married a Communist Interview || 1998 || link
|-
| Christa Maerker || The Roth Explosion: Confessions of a Writer || 1998 || film (duration: 53')
|- 
|Charles McGrath||Zuckerman's Alter Brain || New York Times Book Review, 7 May 2000 ||
|-
|Terry Gross||Interview || Fresh Air (radio), 8 May 2000 || afterward in Fresh Air: Writers Speak with Terry Gross, Minneapolis: Highbridge, 2004; and in Writers Speak: A Collection of Interviews with Writers on Fresh Air with Terry Gross, Boston: WHYY, 2004
|-
| Robert McCrum || A Conversation with Philip Roth || Guardian Unlimited, 1 July 2001 || link
|- 
| David Remnick || Philip Roth at 70 || BBC4, London, 19 March 2003 ||
|-
| Robert Siege || Roth Rewrites History with "The Plot Against America" || "All Things Considered" (radio), 23 September 2004 || WNYC, New York
|- 
| John Freeman || The America That Was, and the Past That Wasn't || San Francisco Chronicle, 3 October 2004 || link
|-
| || "NPR Interview with Philip Roth || NPR's Fresh Air, 11 October 2004 || link 
|- 
| Jeffrey Brown || Interview || «News Hour with Jim Lehrer», PBS, 27 October 2004 and 10 November 2004 ||
|-
|Kurt Anderson||Interview || «Studio 360», 6 November 2004 || WNYC, New York
|-
| Katie Couric || Interview || «Today Show», NBC, 2004 ||
|-
|Tom Ashbrook||Novelist Philip Roth || «On Point», 3 December 2004 || WBUR, Boston
|- 
| Michael Krasny || Interview || Forum, 29 December 2004 || KQED, San Francisco
|-
| Nils Minkmar || Interview || Frankfurter Allgemeine Sonntagszeitung, 8 August 2005 || in German
|- 
| Sacha Verna || Ich frage, was wäre... || Die Zeit, 18 August 2005 || in German
|- 
| Charles McGrath || Why Is This Man Smiling? || New York Times, 4 September 2005, late ed. ||
|-
| Martin Krasnik || It No Longer Feels a Great Injustice That I Have to Die || The Guardian, 14 December 2005 || link
|-
| Terry Gross || Philip Roth Discusses His Latest Accolade || «Fresh Air», 28 December 2005 || WHYY, Philadelphia on link
|-
| Charles McGrath || Philip Roth, Haunted by Illness, Feels Fine || New York Times, 25 April 2006 ||
|-
| Robert Siege || Roth Returns with Life and Death of Everyman || «All Things Considered», 2 May 2006 ||
|-
| Terry Gross || Philip Roth Discusses Everyman || «Fresh Air», 8 May 2006 || WHYY, Philadelphia
|-
| Mark Lawson || Philip Roth’s 21st Century || «Mark Lawson Talks to...», BBC4, London, 3 June 2006 ||
|-
| Volker Hage || Old Age Is a Massacre || Spiegel Online, 25 August 2006 ||
|-
| Hans Olav Brenner || Interview || Bokprogrammet NRK1, 27 August 2007 || NBC
|-
| John Freeman || Philip Roth Ponders Aging || «Star-Ledger» [Newark, NJ], 23 September 2007 ||
|-
| Robert Siegel || Author Says New Zuckerman Novel to Be the Last || «All Things Considered», 24 September 2007 || link
|-
| Terry Gross || Philip Roth's «Ghost» Returns || «Fresh Air», 25 September 2007 || WHYY, Philadelphia
|-
| Hillel Italie || Roth Says Farewell to Fictional Hero || «Associated Press Archive», 27 September 2007 || on link (20 March 2009)
|-
| Robert J. Hughes || Roth Says: Goodbye, Nathan || «Wall Street Journal», 28 September 2007 || link
|-
| Mark Weitzmann || In Conversation... || Washington Post, 30 September 2007 || link
|-
| James Mustich || Roth on Zuckerman's Curtain Call || «Barnes & Noble Review», 1 October 2007 ||
|-
| Hermione Lee || Age Makes a Difference || «The New Yorker», 1 October 2007 || link and link
|-
| Mark Lawson || Philip Roth in His Own Words || «Front Row», Radio 4. BBC, London, 2 October 2007 and The Independent, London, 3 October 2007 || link
|-
| Johanna Schneller || Philip Roth: «I'm not crazy... that time is running out» || The Globe and Mail Canada, 13 October 2007 || link
|-
| Tom Nissley || Exit Zuckerman: An Interview with Philip Roth || No date [but 2007] on Amazon site || transcript of audio interview 
|-
| Klaus Brinkbäumerand Volker Hage || Bush Is Too Horrendous to Be Forgotten || Spiegel Online, 8 February 2008 ||
|-
| Jeffrey A. Trachtenberg || Philip Roth Goes Back to College || The Wall Street Journal, 12 September 2008 || 
|-
| James Marcus || Philip Roth, on Writing and Being Ticked Off || Los Angeles Times, 14 September 2008 || link
|-
| Robert Siege || In Indignation, Roth Draws On His College Days || «All Things Considered», 15 September 2008 || link
|-
| Philip Dodd || Interview || «Night Waves», 15 September 2008 || BBC Radio 3
|-
|Benjamin Taylor||Interview || Live Webcast Sponsored by Houghton Mifflin, 16 September 2008 || 
|-
| Robert Hilferty || Interview || «Muse TV», 19 September 2008 || link and link
|-
| Robert McCrum || The Story of My Lives || Observer Magazine, 21 September 2008 || link
|-
| Jeff Baker || Interview || The Oregonian, 21 September 2008 || Edited and condensed interview. Full version is on link (18 September 2008)
|-
| James Mustich || Philip Roth: Indignation || «Barnes & Noble Review», 3 November 2008 || link
|-
| Andrew Corsello || Last Lion Roaring || Gentlemen's Quarterly, December 2008 ||
|-
| Tina Brown || Philip Roth Unbound || The Daily Beast, 21 October 2009 || link
|-
| Jeffrey A. Trachtenberg || Roth on Roth || Wall Street Journal, 23 October 2009 || link
|-
| Kirsty Wark || Interview || Newsnight, BBC2, London, 30 October 2009 || link
|-
| Paola Zanuttini || Sex and Me || La Repubblica, February 2010 || Italian interview. Notice by Judith Thurman on The New Yorker, 5 April 2010
|-
| Rita Braver || Philip Roth on Fame, Sex and God || CBS News, 10 March 2010 || link
|-
| Chris Wragge and Erica Hill || A Rare Look at Author Phillip Roth || CBS News, 3 October 2010 || link
|-
| || Philip Roth: On Writing, Aging and «Nemesis» || NPR, 14 October 2010 || link
|-
| Benjamin Taylor || Man Booker International Prize 2011 Winner Philip Roth || 23 May 2011 || link video transcript
|-
| Eleanor Wachtel || Philip Roth Interview || CBC Radio, 27 March 2011 || link
|}

 Criticism 
 Glenn Meeter, Bernard Malamud and Philip Roth: A Critical Essay, Grand Rapids: Eerdsmans, 1968
 John N. McDaniel, The Fiction of Philip Roth, Haddonfield, NJ: Haddonfield House, 1974
 Sanford Pinsker, The Comedy That "Hoits": An Essay on the Fiction of Philip Roth, Columbia: University of Missouri Press, 1975
 Bernard F. Rodgers Jr., Philip Roth, Boston: Twayne, 1978
 Judith Paterson Jones e Guinevera A. Nance, Philip Roth, New York: Ungar, 1981
 Sanford Pinsker (ed.), Critical Essays on Philip Roth, Boston: Hall, 1982
 Herminone Lee, Philip Roth, New York: Methuen, 1982
 George J. Searles, The Fiction of Philip Roth and John Updike, Carbondale: Southern Illinois U.P., 1985
 Harold Bloom (ed.), Philip Roth, Modern Critical Views, New York: Chelsea House, 1986; new ed. 2003
 Asher Z. Milbauer e Donald G. Watson (eds.), Reading Philip Roth, New York: St. Martin's Press, 1988
 Murray Baumgarten e Barbara Gottfried, Understanding Philip Roth, Columbia: University of South Carolina Press, 1990
 Jay L. Halio, Philip Roth Revisited, New York: Twayne, 1992
 Alan Cooper, Philip Roth and the Jews, Albany: SUNY Press, 1996
 Stephen Wade, Imagination in Transit: The Fiction of Philip Roth, Sheffield: Sheffield Academic Press, 1996
 Stephen Milowitz, Philip Roth Considered: The Concentrationary Universe of the American Writer, New York: Garland Press, 2000
 Jay L. Halio (ed.), Philip Roth, special issue of Shofar, 19, 1, 2000
 Nandita Singh, Philip Roth: A Novelist in Crisis, New Delhi: Classical Publishing, 2001
 André Bleikasten, Philip Roth: Les ruses de la fiction, Paris: Belin, 2001
 Paule Lévy e Ada Savin (eds.), Profils Américains: Philip Roth, Université Paul-Valéry Montpellier III: CERCLA, 2002
 Mark Shechner, Up Society's Ass, Copper: Rereading Philip Roth, Madison: University of Wisconsin Press, 2003
 Debra Shostak, Philip Roth - Countertexts, Counterlives, Columbia, SC: University of South Carolina Press, 2004
 Harold Bloom (ed.), Portnoy's Complaint: Modern Critical Interpretations, Modern Critical Views, New York: Chelsea House, 2004
 Derek Parker Royal (ed.), Philip Roth's America: The Later Novels, special issue of Studies in American Jewish Literature, 23, 2004
 Yanyu Zeng, Towards Postmodern Multiculturalism: A New Trend of African-American and Jewish American Literature Viewed through Ishmael Reed and Philip Roth, Xiamen: Xiamen U.P., 2004
 Manuel Gogos, Philip Roth & Söhne: Zum jüdischen Familienroman, Hamburg: Philo, 2005
 Jay L. Halio e Ben Siegel, Turning Up the Flame: Philip Roth's Later Novels, Newark, DE: University of Delaware Press, 2005
 Derek Parker Royal (ed.), Philip Roth: New Perspectives on an American Author, Westport, CT: Greenwood-Praeger, 2005 
 Elaine B. Safer, Mocking the Age: The Later Novels of Philip Roth, Albany: State University of New York Press, 2006
 Till Kinzel, Die Tragödie und Komödie des amerikanischen Lebens: Eine Studie zu Zuckermans Amerika in Philip Roths Amerika-Trilogie, Heidelberg: Universitätsverlag Winter GmbH Heidelberg, 2006
 Ross Posnock, Philip Roth's Rude Truth: The Art of Immaturity, Princeton: Princeton U.P., 2006 
 Dean J. Franco (ed.), Roth and Race, special issue of Philip Roth Studies, 2, 2, 2006
 Timothy Parrish (ed.), The Cambridge Companion to Philip Roth, Cambridge U.P., 2007
 David Brauner, Philip Roth, Manchester: Manchester U.P., 2007
 Aimée Pozorski and Miriam Jaffe-Foger (eds.), Mourning Zuckerman, special issue of Philip Roth Studies, 5, 2, 2009
 Balbir Singh, The Early Fiction of Philip Roth New Delhi: Omega Publications, 2009
 Alain Finkielkraut, "La Plaisanterie" (on The Human Stain), in Un coeur intelligent, Paris: Stock/Flammarion, 2009.
 Ben Siegel and Jay L. Halio (eds.), Playful and Serious: Philip Roth as Comic Writer, Newark, DE: University of Delaware Press, 2010
 Alain Finkielkraut, "La complainte du désamour" (on The Professor of Desire), in Et si l'amour durait Paris: Stock, 2011.
 Aimée Pozorski, Roth and Trauma: The Problem of History in the Later Works (1995-2010), New York, NY: Continuum Press, 2012
 Sebastian Schmitt, Fifties Nostalgia in Selected Novels of Philip Roth'' (MOSAIC, 60), Trier, WVT, 2017.

External links
The Philip Roth Society

 
Bibliographies by writer
Bibliographies of American writers